The following events occurred in July 1960:

July 1, 1960 (Friday)

A Soviet MiG fighter north of Murmansk in the Barents Sea shot down a 6-man RB-47. Two United States Air Force officers, First Lts. John R. McKone and Freeman B. Olmstead, survived and were imprisoned in Moscow's Lubyanka prison. The pilot, Major Willard Palm, was killed and his body recovered. The other three crewmen's fates are unknown. The Soviets announced the capture of the men ten days later. The men were finally released on January 25, 1961.
The Belgian Congo assumed the name République du Congo (Republic of Congo), the same name that the former French Congo had assumed in 1958.  To prevent confusion while acknowledging their independence, the two nations would be distinguished in the press by their national capitals, with the former Belgian colony being called "Congo-Leopoldville" and its neighbor "Congo-Brazzaville".  In 1964, Congo-Leopoldville was officially given its current name, "République démocratique du Congo" (Democratic Republic of Congo).
Ghana became a republic, with Prime Minister Kwame Nkrumah as its first President. The Earl of Listowel had served on behalf of Queen Elizabeth II as Governor-General of Ghana.
Italian Somaliland gained its independence from Italy, five days after British Somaliland, and merged into the Somali Republic. Aden Abdullah Othman, leader of the Italian Somaliland legislature, was elected President, and Abdirashid Ali Shermake became Prime Minister.
The Army Ballistic Missile Agency at Redstone Arsenal in Huntsville, Alabama, became the Marshall Space Flight Center, a field center of the civilian National Aeronautics and Space Administration. Wernher von Braun was the center's first director.
In front of a crowd of more than 10,000 spectators, Captain Antony Easterbrook of the UK's Royal Marines fell  to his death when a coupling link failed as he performed a "death slide" during a military tattoo at Madison Square Garden in New York City.

July 2, 1960 (Saturday)
A riot broke out during the Newport Jazz Festival in Newport, Rhode Island, after a crowd of about 3,000 people, mostly white, were angry about a lack of seating for the concerts. Order was not restored until three companies of the state National Guard were sent in.
Former U.S. President Harry S. Truman said at a news conference in Independence, Missouri, that Democratic Party frontrunner John F. Kennedy lacked the maturity to be President, and that Kennedy should decline the nomination. Kennedy responded two days later, saying "I have encountered and survived every kind of hazard and opposition, and I do not intend to withdraw my name now, on the eve of the convention."
Born: Joanna Helbin, Polish archer, in Prudnik, Poland

July 3, 1960 (Sunday)
The French Grand Prix was held at Reims-Gueux and won by Jack Brabham.
A bolt of lightning struck a group of religious pilgrims as they carried a statue of the Virgin Mary to the summit of Mount Bisalta, near Cuneo in Italy. Four were killed and 30 more injured.

July 4, 1960 (Monday)
At the time, there were only seven places in the United States where the national flag was permitted to be flown during hours of darkness.

July 5, 1960 (Tuesday)
The "Congo Crisis" began as the army in the newly independent Republic of Congo mutinied and attacked European civilians after the Belgian commander, Lt. Gen. Émile Janssens, tried to enforce discipline. Europeans fled from Léopoldville where the mutiny started.
Lyndon B. Johnson of Texas, the U.S. Senate Majority Leader, announced that he would seek, and expected that he would receive, the presidential nomination at the upcoming Democratic National Convention.  Johnson asserted that front-runner John F. Kennedy had less than 600 of the required 701 delegates needed for a nomination, and that Johnson had at least 500. The only other candidate for the nomination was Senator Stuart Symington.

July 6, 1960 (Wednesday)
The United States cut its orders for sugar from Cuba by 95 percent, following a July 2 authorization by Congress giving President Eisenhower the power to decrease the quota of sugar purchases.
Eighteen men were killed in the crash of a U.S. Navy blimp off the coast of Barnegat Light, New Jersey.
Bhumibol Adulyadej, King of Thailand, became the first monarch in history to ride on the New York City Subway.
Died: Aneurin Bevan, 62, Welsh politician, British Minister of Health (1945–51), and chief architect of the UK's National Health Service.

July 7, 1960 (Thursday)
Police fired on a crowd of Italian demonstrators in Reggio Emilia, killing five people and injuring 30. (→ it)
The Antarctica Service Medal was established by the United States Congress under Public Law 600 of the 86th Congress.
A reporting plan for Mercury-Atlas and Mercury-Redstone missions was issued. This document was amended on February 17, 1961, and April 10, 1961.
The first meeting of the Mercury Network Coordination Committee was held at Cape Canaveral for the purpose of initiating action on existing problem areas. Subjects under review included operational procedures, range readiness, and other items associated with network operation during a mission.

July 8, 1960 (Friday)
The Havana Sugar Kings minor league baseball team, part of the AAA International League (IL), was ordered moved to Jersey City, New Jersey, by IL Commissioner Frank Shaughnessy.
Born:
Yann LeCun, French computer scientist, in Soisy-sous-Montmorency
 Mal Meninga, Australian Rugby League player; in Bundaberg, Queensland
Died: Werner Meyer-Eppler, 47, German physicist and pioneer in electronic speech synthesis

July 9, 1960 (Saturday)
As the Congo Crisis continued, the Belgian national airline Sabena began airlifting Belgian citizens out of the Congo. Over the next three weeks, 25,711 flew home.
Rodger Woodward, a seven-year-old boy, became the first person known to survive an accidental plunge over Niagara Falls. Roger had been a passenger in a boat on the Niagara River when the outboard motor failed. He fell  over the Falls, but sustained only minor bruises and a cut, and was released from a hospital two days later.
The nuclear submarine  was launched. It would be lost in 1963.
Major General Leighton I. Davis was appointed Department of Defense representative for Project Mercury support, replacing Major General Donald N. Yates.

July 10, 1960 (Sunday)
In Paris, the Soviet Union beat Yugoslavia in extra time on Viktor Ponedelnik's goal, to win the first UEFA European Football Championship, 2–1.
The Havana Sugar Kings played their last game under that name, winning in Richmond and defeating the Virginians, 7-1.  The next day, they played in Miami as the "Jersey City Jerseys", though still wearing their Sugar Kings uniforms.
The Eritrean Liberation Front was founded, with the goal of liberating Eritrea from the rule of Ethiopia.
Born: 
Leandro Alejandro, Filipino nationalist leader (d. 1987)
Ariel Castro, Puerto Rican-American kidnapper and former bus driver, in Duey, Yauco (d. 2013)

July 11, 1960 (Monday)

Moise Tshombe declared the Congolese province of Katanga independent, and, taking advantage of the Congo Crisis and the dismissal of Belgian officers from the Congolese Army, asked for military aid from Belgium. The Congo's Prime Minister Patrice Lumumba asked the United Nations to intervene in the crisis.
Harper Lee's classic novel To Kill a Mockingbird was first published.
A U.S. Navy C-47 cargo transport plane crashed into the side of a mountain near Quito, Ecuador, killing all 18 people on board.
Uttar Pradesh Agricultural University, located at Pantnagar in the Uttar Pradesh state in India, conducted its first classes. It was renamed Govind Ballabh Pant University in 1972.
Born: Jafar Panahi, Iranian filmmaker, in Mianeh

July 12, 1960 (Tuesday)
Orlyonok, the main Young Pioneer camp of the Russian SFSR, was founded.
Louis Robichaud replaced Hugh John Flemming as premier of New Brunswick, Canada. Robichaud would oversee dramatic reforms in the province's hospitals and schools.
The Etch A Sketch was first manufactured. Licensed to Ohio Art Company by French inventor André Cassagnes, it quickly became one of the most popular toys of all time.
The Color Additives Amendments to the Federal Food, Drug, and Cosmetic Act went into effect, regulating artificial coloring of consumer goods sold in the United States.
Beginning on this date, the Mercury astronauts underwent a five-and-one-half day course in "desert survival" training at the Air Training Command Survival School, Stead Air Force Base, Nevada. The possibility of an arid-area landing was remote but did exist. So, this training was accomplished to supply the astronaut with the confidence and ability to survive desert conditions until recovery. The course consisted of one-and-one-half days of academics, one day of field demonstrations, and three days of isolated remote-site training. Survival equipment normally installed in the Mercury spacecraft was used to provide the most realistic conditions.

July 13, 1960 (Wednesday)
U. S. Senator John F. Kennedy won his party's nomination for President on the first ballot at the Democratic National Convention in Los Angeles, but not until Wyoming's 15 delegates gave him the 2/3 majority. With 761 votes needed, Kennedy got 806, while Lyndon Johnson received 409.
The Pilkington Committee on Broadcasting was set up in the UK to review the state of broadcasting. After two years, the Pilkington Committee concluded that the British public did not want commercial broadcasting.
Khieu Samphan, editor of the Phnom Penh newspaper L'Observatueur, was arrested and beaten by ten members of Cambodia's security police. As one author would note later, "There is no telling how many people later paid with their lives for this insult."  Samphan would later help found the Communist Khmer Rouge and, 15 years later as the leader of the revolutionary government, would oversee a program of genocide in Cambodia.
Nobusuke Kishi, the Prime Minister of Japan, was stabbed six times in his left leg at his home, but the wounds were not life-threatening.
Born: Ian Hislop, British journalist and broadcaster, in Mumbles, Swansea

July 14, 1960 (Thursday)

The day before, U.S. Senator Stuart Symington of Missouri had been asked, and agreed, to become Kennedy's choice for the vice-presidency.
By an 8–0 vote, the United Nations Security Council authorized the sending of U.N. forces to restore order in the Congo and in Katanga, and to request that Belgium withdraw its troops. The first U.N. forces arrived from Tunisia the next day.
Personnel strength in support of Project Mercury was 543. This included 419 assigned to the Space Task Group, and 124 personnel from the Langley Research Center.
A fire at a mental hospital in Guatemala City killed 225 of the nearly 1,600 patients there.
Born:
Anna Bligh, Australian politician, Premier of Queensland 2007-2012 and the first woman to be elected, rather than appointed, as the Premier of an Australian state; in Warwick, Queensland
Jane Lynch, American actress; in Evergreen Park, Illinois
Died: Maurice de Broglie, 85, French physicist

July 15, 1960 (Friday)
Nobusuke Kishi resigned as Prime Minister of Japan, after conceding that the government was unable to control Leftist demonstrations. Three days later, the Diet confirmed Hayato Ikeda as the new Premier.
Died: Lawrence Tibbett, 63, American opera singer

July 16, 1960 (Saturday)
The Soviet Union completed the Sino-Soviet split by notifying the government of the People's Republic of China that all 1,390 Soviet advisors and experts there would be withdrawn. Over the next month, the Soviets cancelled twelve economic and technological agreements, and 200 joint projects.
The phrase "New Frontier", which would be used to describe the policies of John F. Kennedy, was first used in Kennedy's acceptance of the Democratic presidential nomination in Los Angeles. After referring to the American West ("what was once the 'last frontier'"), Kennedy said that "we stand today on the edge of a new frontier— the frontier of the 1960s".
Died: 
Field Marshal Albert Kesselring, 74, German Luftwaffe leader
John P. Marquand, 66, American author

July 17, 1960 (Sunday)
Joseph Kasavubu and Patrice Lumumba, unhappy with the United Nations' progress in pressuring Belgium to withdraw its troops from the former Belgian Congo, added a new dimension to the Congo Crisis that, if Belgian troops did not withdraw within 48 hours, the Congolese leaders would invite the Soviet Union to send troops to the African nation.
Born: Robin Shou, Hong Kong actor and martial artist
Died: Pavol Peter Gojdič, 72, imprisoned Czechoslovakian bishop, at Leopoldov.

July 18, 1960 (Monday)
In Chicago, the National League's owners voted unanimously to expand from eight teams to ten, and to meet with leaders of the American League and the new Continental League to plan the growth of Major League Baseball. The new NL teams, both in CL cities, would be the New York Mets and the Houston Colt .45s (later the Houston Astros).
Born: William A. Dembski, American mathematician and proponent of "intelligent design", in Chicago.

July 19, 1960 (Tuesday)
Fernando Tambroni resigned as Prime Minister of Italy. A new government was approved on August 5, headed by former Premier Amintore Fanfani.
Thirty-three iron miners in West Germany were killed in a mine fire near Salzgitter.
Thirty-nine of the 43 Belgian Air Force servicemen, on board a Fairchild C-119G "Flying Boxcar" were killed, when their plane struck a mountain near Goma during the Congo Crisis.
Trans Australia Airlines Flight 408 was taken over by a gunman, Alex Hildebrandt of Russia, in the first airplane hijacking in Australia. The hijack was foiled when Hildebrandt was overpowered by the plane's first officer.
At 8:30 pm EST, CBS aired the unsold pilot for "Head of the Family" on Comedy Spot. The pilot had Carl Reiner as TV writer Rob Petrie, Barbara Britton as Rob's wife Laura, Sylvia Miles as Sally Rogers and Morty Gunty as Buddy Sorrell. In 1961, CBS would score a hit with a new name and a new cast of Dick Van Dyke, Mary Tyler Moore, Rose Marie and Morey Amsterdam.

July 20, 1960 (Wednesday)
Sirimavo Bandaranaike became the world's first elected female head of government, after her Sri Lanka Freedom Party won a majority in elections in Ceylon (now Sri Lanka). Mrs. Bandaranaike, whose husband S.W.D. Bandaranaike had been Prime Minister until his assassination in 1959, took office as Prime Minister of Ceylon the next day, and assumed the jobs of Defense Minister and External Affairs Minister as well.
The submarine  made the first launch of a rocket from underwater into the air, with the firing of an unarmed Polaris missile while submerged at a depth of 30 feet.
All 23 passengers and crew were killed on Aeroflot Flight 613 when their Ilyushin Il-14 airliner encountered turbulence, and broke apart in midair during a flight from Leningrad to the smaller city of Syktyvkar.
Born: Prvoslav Vujcic, Serbian Canadian writer, in Požarevac, Yugoslavia

July 21, 1960 (Thursday)
The Parliament of Canada extended the right to vote in federal elections to the remaining First Nations indigenous citizens who hadn't previously received full suffrage, as an amendment to the Canada Elections Act passed its third reading in the Senate and was sent onward for assent.  The people granted rights were the 60,000 "Status Indians" who lived on Canada's Indian reserves.  The right had previously been extended to about 20,000 members of the First Nations, specifically veterans and their wives, members who did not live on a reserve, and to those living in the Northwest Territories and the Yukon.  The Act received royal assent on August 1.
Francis Chichester, English navigator and yachtsman, arrived in New York aboard Gipsy Moth III to win the inaugural Single-Handed Trans-Atlantic Race., 40 days after setting sail across the Atlantic Ocean, setting a new record.
The first television station in Egypt began broadcasting. After a verse from the Quran was read, United Arab Republic President Gamal Abdel Nasser was shown live, making a speech during celebrations of the eighth anniversary of the 1952 revolution.

July 22, 1960 (Friday)
Jean Lesage replaced Antonio Barrette as Premier of Quebec, and began the Quiet Revolution reforms to that province.
Vincent Massey became the first Canadian to receive the Royal Victorian Chain in its 58 years as an honour, as a recognition from Queen Elizabeth II.
Born: John Leguizamo, Colombian-American actor, comedian and producer, in Bogota

July 23, 1960 (Saturday)
Yusof bin Ishak, the Yang di-Pertuan Negara of Singapore, opened the headquarters of St. John Ambulance in Singapore.
The Soviet Union launched a space capsule with two dogs, Pchelka and Mushka, in advance of human spaceflight. Korabl 3 burned up upon re-entry into the atmosphere.
Mercury spacecraft No. 2 was delivered to Cape Canaveral for the Mercury-Redstone 1A (MR-1A) mission.

July 24, 1960 (Sunday)

Soviet Marshal Ivan Konev retired as chief of the Warsaw Pact, and was replaced by another Soviet military man, Marshal Andrei Grechko. Marshal Grechko would become the Soviet Minister of Defense in 1967, and would be replaced as Warsaw Pact commander by Marshal Ivan Yakubovsky on July 8, 1967.
An accident killed 30 Japanese tourists and injured 16 others who were on a chartered sightseeing bus, on their way back down from visiting the Buddhist shrine at Mount Hiei, after sideswiping another bus and plunging off of a mountain road into a ravine.  Reportedly, the tourist bus "shot 60 yards straight down and then rolled over for another 100 yards before crashing."  The persons on the other bus were uninjured.
Died:  
Hans Albers, 68, leading man of German film in the 1930s and early 1940s 
Jacques Jaccard, 73, American silent film director in the 1910s and 1920s

July 25, 1960 (Monday)
Integration of Greensboro's other restaurants did not happen until 1963.

July 26, 1960 (Tuesday)
Fifteen months after U.S. President Eisenhower had proposed that the Soviet Union and the United States be allowed to inspect their opponents' missile sites, the Soviets made a counteroffer "to allow international inspection teams to carry out three on-site inspections annually on its territory."    The U.S. and its allies considered the number to be inadequate, but saw it as the basis for negotiations. Actual inspections would not take place until more than 25 years later. 
The opening title sequence of The Andy Griffith Show, showing Andy Griffith and Ron Howard preparing to go fishing, was filmed in advance of the show's October 3 premiere. The Franklin Canyon Reservoir in Los Angeles served as Myers Lake (named for the show's production manager, Frank E. Myers) on the outskirts of Mayberry, North Carolina, for purposes of the show.
Died:  
Cedric Gibbons, 67, pioneering Irish-American film art director
Maud Menten, 81, Canadian biochemist

July 27, 1960 (Wednesday)
The Republic of Ireland ended its policy of neutrality with the dispatch of soldiers of the 32nd Infantry Battalion to Africa to join United Nations peacekeeping forces during the Congo Crisis. The Defence Amendment Act 1960 had taken effect the day before after passing both houses of the Irish parliament.
Mercury launch site recovery forces exercised in recovery operations following simulated spacecraft landings off Cape Canaveral. Coordination and control of the recovery forces were rated highly satisfactory.
In Chicago, delegates to the Republican National Convention nominated U.S. Vice President Richard M. Nixon for President, with 1,321 votes. Ten delegates voted for Barry Goldwater. U.S. Ambassador to the United Nations Henry Cabot Lodge, Jr. was nominated for Vice President.
The Federal Reserve Board voted to cut margin requirements from 90% to 70%, in order to encourage buying and selling in the American stock market.

July 28, 1960 (Thursday)
The Chinese hibiscus was adopted as the Malaysian national flower and renamed Bunga Raya.

July 29, 1960 (Friday)

In new elections in South Korea, the Democrat party, led by Chang Myon (also known as John M. Chang and Tsutomu Tamaoka), won a majority. Chang became Prime Minister of South Korea on August 19.
Number 10 Downing Street, the official London residence of the British Prime Minister, was closed for renovations expected to last at least two years. Harold Macmillan's home was transferred for the interim to Admiralty House.
Mercury spacecraft No. 3 was delivered to Langley Field for a noise and vibration test.
Mercury-Atlas 1 (MA-1) was launched from Cape Canaveral on a sub-orbital flight, with mission objectives being to check the integrity of the Mercury spacecraft structure and afterbody shingles for a reentry associated with a critical abort and to evaluate the open-loop performance of the Atlas abort-sensing instrumentation system. The spacecraft contained no escape system and no test subject. Standard posigrade rockets were used to separate the spacecraft from the Atlas, but the retrorockets were dummies. About 59 seconds after launch, the flight was terminated because of a launch vehicle and adapter structural failure. The spacecraft was destroyed upon impact with the water because the recovery system was not designed to actuate under the imposed flight conditions. Later most of the spacecraft, the booster engines, and the liquid oxygen vent valve were recovered from the ocean floor. Since none of the primary flight objectives was achieved, Mercury-Atlas 2 (MA-2) was planned to fulfill the mission.
The U.S. Federal Communications Commission voted 6–1 against censorship of American radio and television communications, following hearings in which various witnesses testified in favor of FCC intervention.
Born: Marta Cid, Catalan Education Minister, in Amposta, Spain

July 30, 1960 (Saturday)
The American Football League played its first game, an exhibition between the Buffalo Bills and the Boston Patriots, before a crowd of 16,474 in Buffalo, and the home team lost, 28 to 7. Bob Dee of the Patriots recovered a fumble in the end zone for the first unofficial AFL score.
South Korea and North Korea fought a battle as at sea for the first time since the end of the Korean War in 1953, with a North Korean gunboat being sunk near Kojin.

July 31, 1960 (Sunday)
The Malayan Emergency was officially ended after twelve years. On June 16, 1948, the state of emergency was declared in the Federation of Malaya after guerrilla activity had begun. The date had been announced on April 19 by the Malayan head of state, Sultan Hisamuddin Alam Shah.

Lieutenant Columbo, the fictional TV detective who would be more famously portrayed by actor Peter Falk, was introduced in a 90-minute episode of the anthology series The Chevy Mystery Show, shown at 9:00 Eastern time on NBC. Bert Freed was the first to portray Lieutenant Columbo, described as "a police detective harassing the doctor", though actor Richard Carlson (who portrayed a psychiatrist who murdered his wife) received top billing in the teleplay, titled "Enough Rope".

References

1960
1960-07
1960-07